Allen "Al" Pluymers or Pluimers (born June 8, 1957) is a former Dutch-Canadian ice hockey player. He played for the Netherlands men's national ice hockey team at the 1980 Winter Olympics in Lake Placid and at the 1981 World Ice Hockey Championships.

References

External links

1957 births
Living people
Canadian people of Dutch descent
Dutch ice hockey defencemen
GIJS Groningen players
Ice hockey people from Ontario
Ice hockey players at the 1980 Winter Olympics
Olympic ice hockey players of the Netherlands
Sportspeople from Windsor, Ontario